Poo is one of nine parroquias in Cabrales, a municipality of the autonomous community of Asturias, in northern Spain. It has an area of 10.28 km², and a population of 214 (INE 2015) all in the same settlement.  Poo is located 158 meters above sea level. It lies 1.5 km from Carreña, the capital of Cabrales.

References

Parishes in Cabrales